Thakot or Takot is a tribal town on the Indus River in Battagram District of Khyber Pakhtunkhwa, Pakistan.  It is also one of twenty Union Councils of Battagram District, and one of twelve in Battagram Tehsil. Thakot is located midway between Battagram town in the south and Besham town (Shangla District) in the north, at a distance of about 30 km from both.

Climate
With a mild and generally warm and temperate climate, Thakot features a humid subtropical climate (Cfa) under the Köppen climate classification. The average temperature in Thakot is 21.1 °C, while the annual precipitation averages 896 mm. Even in the driest months, there is a lot of precipitation. November is the driest month with 19 mm of precipitation, while August, the wettest month, has an average precipitation of 157 mm.

June is the hottest month of the year with an average temperature of 31.1 °C. The coldest month January has an average temperature of 9.5 °C.

Demography
Most of the people living here belong to the Swati tribe. Mangian families also live in Thakot.  The people of Thakot speak Pashto natively as well as Urdu but the educated people also know English.

Hydro
The Water and Power Development Authority (WAPDA) is building 2,800 MW Hydel Power Project Thakot at an estimated cost of $5 billion. The Pakistan government has proposed Russian cooperation in the project.

References

Union councils of Battagram District